P Ahobala Reddy (also spelt P Obul Reddy due to a spelling mistake made while admitting him into school) (died 30 June 2010) was an entrepreneur, industrialist, philanthropist and patron of the arts.

Reddy was among the first industrialists from the south of India to take an interest in the television business and he was the proprietor of the firm that sold Dyanora TV sets. He was the former managing director and founder of Nippo Batteries. Among his other involvements in business, he was at one time the managing director of Panasonic India.

He was 85 when he died in 2010 and was survived by two sons and three daughters. His son P. Dwarakanath Reddy is married to Suneeta Reddy, the daughter of Apollo Hospitals founder Prathap C. Reddy.

See also 
 P Obul Reddy Public School

References 

Year of birth missing
Indian philanthropists
Indian industrialists
2010 deaths